The 1898 Storrs Aggies football team represented Storrs Agricultural College, now the University of Connecticut, in the 1898 college football season.  This was the third year that the school fielded a football team.  The Aggies played their first season with a head coach, E. S. Mansfield, and completed the season with a record of 0–3.

Schedule

References

Storrs
UConn Huskies football seasons
College football winless seasons
Storrs Aggies football